Christian Brembeck (born 1960 in Munich) is a German conductor, organist and harpsichordist.

He studied organ, piano and conducting at the Hochschule für Musik und Theater München in Munich, and was awarded the Organ Prize of the City of Würzburg in 1981. After graduating in 1987, he joined the Munich Philharmonic Orchestra. He has performed as a musician and conductor all over Europe, USA, Israel, the Far East and South America. He has also appeared with the Munich Radio Orchestra, the Bamberger Symphoniker and the Collegium Aureum. He has been an accompanist of the Tölzer Knabenchor. Since 1992 he has been the conductor of the chamber orchestra Capella Istropolitana in Bratislava.

References

External links

Christian Brembeck website
Brembeck, Organo bravomaestro.com

German male conductors (music)
German organists
German male organists
German harpsichordists
University of Music and Performing Arts Munich alumni
1960 births
Living people
21st-century German conductors (music)
21st-century organists
21st-century German male musicians